Williamsville Central School District (commonly abbreviated WCSD) is a public school district in New York that serves the village of Williamsville, as well as the towns of Amherst, Cheektowaga, and Clarence.  The district enrollment is approximately 10,600 students throughout 13 schools in the district.  The district superintendent is Dr. Darren Brown-Hall. It is headquartered near Casey Middle School and North High School at 105 Casey Rd, East Amherst, NY 14051. The district also has an active technology distribution drive which provides all middle schoolers with Chromebooks.

Schools

Elementary school
Elementary schools cover kindergarten to Grade 4.
Country Parkway Elementary School (Opened in 1968)
Dodge Elementary School (Opened in 1953)
Forest Elementary School (Opened in 1955)
Heim Elementary School (Opened in 1966)
Maple East Elementary School (Opened in 1959)
Maple West Elementary School (Opened in 1966)

Middle school
Middle schools cover Grade 5 to grade 8. 
Casey Middle School (Opened in 1970)
Heim Middle School (Opened in 1964)
Mill Middle School (Opened in 1958)
Transit Middle School (Opened in 1993)

High school
High schools cover grade 9 to grade 12.
Williamsville East High School (Opened in 1975)
Williamsville North High School (Opened in 1968)
Williamsville South High School (Opened in 1950)

Additional Info
The entire district utilizes  an online information tracking system called WITS (an abbreviation for Williamsville Information Tracking System) which is used by students, parents, teachers, and other staff to track student grades, clubs, events, class-specific documents and student-teacher/parent-teacher communication. Additionally, students are able to take quizzes and tests on the website, in which they will be automatically graded when they finish taking the quiz/test.

A Williamsville Central School District principal, Dr. Daniel Walh, (principal of Transit Middle School) was named 2021 New York State Secondary School Principal of the Year by the School Administrators Association of New York State.

Ranking 
Top district out of 97 public school districts in western NY, 2012.
Williamsville East, South, North High schools awarded gold, silver medals in 2012 U.S. News Best High Schools, ranking 57th, 86th, 88th out of 1165 in the state respectively. These 3 high schools rank among the top 2-3% out of 21,776 public high schools nationally; 2012.

References

External links
School District Webpage
2006-07 NYS School Report Card
Business First of Buffalo: Business First's 2009-2010 Guide to Western New York Schools

School districts in New York (state)
Education in Erie County, New York